Butler Island is a circular, ice-covered island  wide which rises to , lying  east of Merz Peninsula, off the eastern coast of Palmer Land. It was discovered and photographed from the air in December 1940 by the United States Antarctic Service. During 1947 it was photographed from the air by the Ronne Antarctic Research Expedition, who in conjunction with the Falkland Islands Dependencies Survey (FIDS) charted it from the ground. It was named by FIDS for K.S.P. Butler, FIDS commander in 1947–48.

See also 
 List of Antarctic and sub-Antarctic islands

References 

Islands of Palmer Land